George William Thompson (born 1956) is an American international trade attorney, an adjunct professor at George Mason University Schar School of Policy and Government and a published author on international trade.  He currently has his own firm, Thompson and Associates, in Washington, DC.

Education and career 
Thompson attended the State University of New York (Oneonta) and graduated in 1978. He then attended the Cornell Law School and received the degree of Juris Doctor in 1981.

In 1987, Thompson became an Attorney Advisor in the General Counsel's Office of the U.S. International Trade Commission and litigated numerous cases on the commission's behalf during his six-year tenure.  He was involved in several important cases of the day including litigation involving a dispute with Canada over softwood lumber imports and with Norway over the dumping of salmon in U.S. markets and the investigations concerning Flat-Rolled Carbon Steel Products from numerous countries.

For 14 months, he was detailed to the Office of the U.S. Trade Representative and was involved in dispute resolution cases concerning the General Agreement on Trade and Tariffs (GATT).

He has also worked for the New York international trade law firm of Donohue & Donohue and the Washington, DC firms of Plaia Schaumberg & deKieffer, Pettit and Martin, and Neville Peterson in which he became a partner.

In 1995, he became an Adjunct Professor at the George Mason University Schar School of Policy and Government.  Today, he teaches courses entitled ABCs of Importing and Exporting, International Contract Negotiation, and Export Controls and Compliance.

In 2008, he was appointed a World Trade Organization Arbitrator as a member of the U.S. Roster Dispute Resolution Panel.

Thompson started his own law firm in August 2014, Thompson and Associates, located in Washington, DC. He focusses on counseling regarding international trade issues.

His clients have included Xerox, Pepsi, Polaris Industries and others.

He is admitted to the following bars: State of New York, District of Columbia, United States Court of International Trade and Court of Appeals for the Federal Circuit.

Author 
Thompson has written and co-authored several publications regarding international trade issues.

 Transnational Contracts, Thomson-Reuters, 2011–2016. 
 Intellectual Property Rights and United States International Trade Laws (Co-Author), Oxford, Oxford University Press, 2003 
 Exporting: Regulations, Documentation, Procedures (Co-Author), Global Training Center, 2015 
 Managing Forwarders, Brokers & Carriers in Your International Supply Chain (Co-Author), Global Training Center, 2015. 
 Customs Law and Administration (Contributing Author). Thomson Reuters, 2011–2015. 
 Judicial Review of International Trade Commission Determinations from October 1990 to September 1992 (Co-Author), International business Journal, v. 25, n. 1, Fall, 1993.
 Political and Policy Dimensions of Foreign Trade Zones (Co-Author), Vanderbilt Journal of Transnational Law. v. 18, 1987.

References

External links 
 Thompson & Associates, PLLC
 Faculty Page, George Mason University Schar School of Policy and Government

1956 births
Living people
State University of New York at Oneonta alumni
Cornell Law School alumni
Lawyers from Washington, D.C.
George Mason University faculty